Złotowo may refer to the following places:
Złotowo, Greater Poland Voivodeship (west-central Poland)
Złotowo, Żnin County in Kuyavian-Pomeranian Voivodeship (north-central Poland)
Złotowo, Masovian Voivodeship (east-central Poland)
Złotowo, Chojnice County in Pomeranian Voivodeship (north Poland)
Złotowo, Kościerzyna County in Pomeranian Voivodeship (north Poland)
Złotowo, Malbork County in Pomeranian Voivodeship (north Poland)
Złotowo, Warmian-Masurian Voivodeship (north Poland)
Złotowo, West Pomeranian Voivodeship (north-west Poland)